In the Philippines, a baklâ (Tagalog and Cebuano), bayot (Cebuano) or agî (Hiligaynon) is a person who was assigned male at birth and has adopted a feminine gender expression. They are often considered a third gender. Many bakla are exclusively attracted to men and some identify as women. The polar opposite of the term in Philippine culture is tomboy (natively the lakin-on or binalaki), which refers to women with a masculine gender expression (usually, but not always, lesbian). The term is commonly incorrectly applied to trans women.

Bakla are socially and economically integrated into Filipino society, having been accepted by society prior to Western colonization, many of which were held in high regard and performed the role of spiritual leaders known as babaylan, katalonan, and other shamans in pre-colonial Philippines. However, a minority group of Filipinos disapprove or reject the baklas, usually on religious grounds. The stereotype of a baklâ is a parlorista—a flamboyant, camp cross-dresser who works in a beauty salon; in reality, the bakla thrives in numerous sectors of society, from the lower to the upper levels.

Etymology
In modern Filipino and Cebuano, the term "baklâ" is usually used to mean either "effeminate man" or "homosexual". Martin F. Manalansan, a Filipino anthropologist, has identified two possible origins of the term. One is that it may have been a portmanteau of the words babae ("woman"), and lalaki, meaning ("man"). The other is that it is derived from the word for the pre-colonial shamaness in most Filipino ethnic groups, the babaylan.

However, the word itself has been used for centuries, albeit in different contexts. In Old Tagalog, bacla meant "uncertainty" or "indecisiveness". Effeminate homosexual men were instead called binabaé ("like a woman") or bayogin (also spelled bayugin or bayoguin, "infertile"), during the Spanish colonial period.

The Tagalog poet Francisco Balagtas used the word bacla in reference to "a temporary lack of resolve", as seen in his popular works Florante at Laura and Orosman at Zafira. This archaic usage is also seen in the 17th-century Tagalog religious epic Casaysayan nang Pasiong Mahal ni Jesucristong Panginoon Natin na Sucat Ipag-alab nang Puso nang Sinomang Babasa ("Story of the Passion of Jesus Christ Our Lord that Surely Shall Ignite the Heart of Whosoever Readeth"), which is chanted during Holy Week. The passage narrating the Agony in the Garden has a verse that reads "Si Cristo'y nabacla" ("Christ was confused").

By the advent of World War II, the term baklâ had evolved to mean "fearful" or "weakened" in Tagalog, and became a derogatory term for effeminate men. A common euphemism for baklâ during this period was pusong babae (literally "female-hearted"). It wasn't until the 1990s when more positive discourse on queer and gay identities became more mainstream that baklâ lost its original derogatory connotation.

Other native terms for bakla also exist in other languages of the Philippines, some of them now considered archaic. They are also called bayot,  binabáye, bayen-on (or babayen-on), or dalopapa in Cebuano; agî in Hiligaynon/Ilonggo;  dampog or bayot in Waray;  bantut or binabae in Tausug; bantut or dnda-dnda in Sinama; and labia in Subanen.

In addition, there are numerous modern neologisms for bakla, especially within swardspeak, with varying levels of acceptance. These include terms like badáf, badíng, beki, judíng, shokì, shoklâ, sward, and vaklúsh, among many others.

Definition
Baklâ is a gender identity characterized by the adoption of a feminine gender expression by men. This includes feminine mannerisms and speech, use of make-up, cross-dressing, and long hairstyles; all are referred to with the umbrella term kabaklaán (effeminacy). However, baklâ is not tied to sexuality and is not a sexual orientation, thus it is not a direct equivalent of the English term "gay". Baklâ are usually homosexual men, but on rare occasions, they can also be heterosexual or bisexual men.

Because the term baklâ specifically denotes effeminacy, it is traditionally not applied to masculine gay men. However, due to increasing globalization and influence from the Western categories of sexual orientation, baklâ has become incorrectly equated with the gay identity and used generally for homosexual men, regardless of the individual's masculinity or femininity in presentation.

Baklâ are often considered the natural "third gender" in Filipino culture. This is illustrated in the children's rhyme that begins by listing four distinct genders: "girl, boy, baklâ, tomboy." Like in English, the term tomboy (archaic lakin-on or binalaki) refers to masculine (usually lesbian) women, and is understood as the polar opposite of the baklâ.

Baklâ is also commonly used as a term for trans women, though this is incorrect and discouraged. This is largely due to the absence of modern local terms for transgender people, as well as the general public ignorance of the differences between homosexuality and transsexuality. Some organizations have pushed for the adoption of new terminology that distinguishes transgender people from the baklâ, to prevent the common derogatory misconception that trans women and trans men are simply baklâ and tomboy that have undergone sex reassignment surgery. One such proposal in 2008 by the Society of Transsexual Women of the Philippines (STRAP) is transpinay (for trans women) and transpinoy (for trans men), both derived from the Filipino endonym "pinoy". But it has yet to gain widespread acceptance.

The difficulty of correlating definitions with western terminology is because of the fundamental difference in the cultural views on homosexuality. According to Filipino academic J. Neil Garcia, the baklâ would fall under the inversion pattern of homosexuality identified by American psychobiologist James D. Weinrich. This is the cultural view where homosexuality is seen as an inversion of the gender and sex binary. In Philippine context, this would be the binary of the loób (the inner self or spirit, lit. "inside") and labás (the physical form, lit. "outside"). Thus it is similar to the South Asian hijra and the Native American two-spirit. This is contrasted to the other two patterns of homosexuality worldwide, namely age-biased patterns (like pederasty in Ancient Greece) and role-playing patterns (like in certain Middle Eastern and Latin American cultures).

History

Homosexual relations in both sexes were common and bore no stigma in pre-colonial Philippines. There are numerous accounts of feminized men in early Spanish records. They were described as being dressed as women, worked in traditionally female roles, and were treated as women by the community. They were considered as comparable to biological women aside from their incapability to give birth to children. They were even recorded as being married to men. Some also married women, though this did not preclude homosexual relationships.

Due to their association to the feminine, they were regarded as having greater powers of intercession with the anito (ancestral and nature spirits) and thus commonly became shamans (babaylan, a traditionally female role in Philippine cultures). This is not unique to the Philippines and was also common in pre-colonial societies in the rest of Island Southeast Asia; like the bissu of the Bugis people, the warok of the Javanese people, and the manang bali of the Iban people.

Shamans were highly respected members of the community as ritual specialists: healing the sick, keeping oral histories, performing sorcery, and serving as spirit mediums for communicating with ancestral and nature spirits. They were second only to the nobility in the social hierarchy, and could function as a community's interim leader (similar to a regent or interrex) in the absence of the datu.

In Historia de las islas e indios de Bisayas (1668), the Spanish historian and missionary Francisco Ignacio Alcina records that the asog became shamans by virtue of being themselves. Unlike female shamans, they neither needed to be chosen nor did they undergo initiation rites. However, not all asog trained to become shamans. Castano (1895) states that the people of Bicol would hold a thanksgiving ritual called atang that was "presided" by an "effeminate" priest called an asog. His female counterpart, called a baliana, assisted him and led women in singing the soraki in honor of Gugurang, the supreme deity of Bikol mythology. Regardless, the majority of shamans in most Philippine precolonial cultures were female.

During the three centuries of Spanish colonization (1565–1898), the Catholic Church introduced harsh measures to suppress both female and asog shamans. In realms and polities absorbed by the Spanish Empire, shamans were maligned and falsely accused as witches and "priests of the devil", and were persecuted violently by the Spanish clergy. The previously high status of the babaylan was thus lost. The role of women and the relative gender egalitarianism of Philippine animistic cultures, in general, became more subdued under the patriarchal culture of the Spanish.

The most strongly affected by this religious shift to Abrahamic religions were the feminized male asog shamans. During the 17th to 18th centuries, Spanish administrators in the Philippines burned people convicted of homosexual relations at the stake and confiscated their possessions, in accordance to a decree by the president of the Real Audiencia, Pedro Hurtado Desquibel. Several instances of such punishments were recorded by the Spanish priest Juan Francisco de San Antonio in his Chronicas de la Apostolica Provincia de San Gregorio (1738–1744).

Asog shamans were leaders of several revolts against Spanish rule from the 17th century to the 18th century. Notable ones include the Tamblot uprising of Bohol in 1621–1622 and the Tapar rebellion in Panay in 1663. Later rebellions in the 19th and 20th centuries were also led by male shamans. However, these later shamans (collectively known as the dios-dios, "god pretenders") followed syncretic Folk Catholicism, rather than pre-colonial anito shamanism. Though they still dressed as women in rituals, they were married to women and were unlikely to be homosexual.

Feminized men were also persecuted harshly in the (then recently) Islamized ethnic groups in Mindanao. In Historia de las Islas de Mindanao, Iolo, y sus adyacentes (1667), the Spanish priest Francisco Combés records that their "unnatural crime" was punished by the Muslim peoples in Mindanao with death by burning or drowning, and that their houses and property were also burned as they believed that it was contagious.

This was followed by American colonization (1898–1946), which though secular, introduced the idea that homosexuality and effeminacy was a "sickness". Despite this, the colonization of the Philippines did not fully erase the traditional equivocal views of Filipinos with regards to queer and liminal sexual and gender identities. Though there are still problem areas, Filipino culture as a whole remains relatively accepting of non-heteronormative identities like the baklâ.

Culture

In the second edition of the now-defunct gay lifestyle magazine Icon Magazine, editor Richie Villarin quoted one of the magazine's advertisers as saying "We cannot remain oblivious to your market".

Baklâs have been instrumental in the opening of several night clubs in the Philippines and can also be found in service, retail, and both sexual and non-sexual entertainment industries. Despite their high visibility, acceptance of baklâs is limited, especially for gay professionals.

Beauty pageants
Baklâ communities are renowned for staging beauty pageants, with Miss Gay Philippines being national in scope. Participants model swimsuits, national costume, and dresses, and showcase their talents, as in female beauty pageants worldwide.

Swardspeak

Baklâs have an argot, or secret language, called swardspeak. It is used by both masculine and feminine baklâs and incorporates elements from Filipino, Philippine English and Spanish, spoken with a hyper-feminised inflection. It was widespread and popular until the 1990s, but is now considered unfashionable in most parts of Manila. Modern versions of swardspeak are generally called "beki language", "gay lingo", or "gayspeak". They commonly make their way into mainstream Filipino culture. One early example is the song "Bongga Ka, 'Day" (1979), the biggest hit song of the Filipino Manila Sound band Hotdog. The title of the song means "You're fabulous, Girl" and uses the swardspeak slang bongga ( "fabulous").

Babaeng bakla

Heterosexual women who develop deep friendships or almost exclusively associate with the native bakla LGBT subculture are known as babaeng bakla (literally "a woman who is a bakla"). They stereotypically acquire the mannerisms, campy sense of humor, lingo, and fashion sense of the bakla. They are also usually more extroverted and socially dominant. It is commonly perceived as a positive self-identification, and various prominent local celebrities (like Maricel Soriano and Rufa Mae Quinto) openly identify as babaeng bakla.

Legal status

Since independence, noncommercial, homosexual relations between two adults in private have never been criminalized in the Philippines, although sexual conduct or affection that occurs in public may be subject to the "grave scandal" prohibition in Article 200 of the Revised Penal Code (though this is applied to everyone, not only LGBTQ people).

In December 2004, it was reported that Marawi City had issued an ordinance banning bakla from going out in public wearing female attire, makeup, earrings "or other ornaments to express their inclinations for femininity". The ordinance passed by the Marawi City Council also bans skintight blue jeans, tube tops and other skimpy attire. Additionally, women (only) must not "induce impure thoughts or lustful desires." The Mayor said these moves were part of a "cleaning and cleansing" drive.

Same-sex marriage is not recognised in the Philippines, preventing many homosexual men from getting married. Legislation attempting to legalise same-sex marriage in the Philippines has been presented to Congress, but none has passed thus far.

Religion

The Philippines is predominantly Christian, with over 80% of Filipinos belonging to the Roman Catholic Church. Church doctrine officially tolerates persons with such orientations but condemns homosexual activity as "intrinsically disordered." This condemnation of homosexuality presents a problem for baklâ because of potential discrimination in a Catholic-dominated society. As a result, baklâ youth in particular are at a higher risk for suicide, depression and substance abuse than their heterosexual peers, with risk increasing as parental acceptance decreases.

While a significant minority, baklâ adherents of Protestantism face varying degrees of acceptance based on the denomination to which they belong. The Philippine Independent Church, which is in full communion with the worldwide Anglican Communion, officially does not endorse homosexuality. Various Evangelical churches and the Iglesia ni Cristo are more fundamentalist in doctrine, and thus strongly condemn homosexual acts and suppress such identities within their congregations.

Non-Christian Filipinos who profess Islam, Buddhism, Hinduism and other faiths also present a wide range of doctrinal views. Islam, the second largest religion in the Philippines, comprises roughly 5.57% of the population. Islam shares views with other Abrahamic Faiths in that homosexual acts are held to be sinful. According to the Delhi High Court, Hinduism does not officially condemn homosexuality. As for Buddhism, the Dalai Lama (who is the most influential figure of the Gelug tradition of Tibetan Buddhism) has maintained that homosexuality is "sexual misconduct" for Buddhist followers but does not condemn it for non-believers.

See also
 Ladlad
 LGBT in the Philippines
 LGBT rights in the Philippines
 Culture of the Philippines
 Home for the Golden Gays
 Babaylan
 Drag Race Philippines
 Māhū – equivalent of bakla in Hawaii.
 Fa'afafine – equivalent of bakla ('binabae') in Samoa.
 Takatāpui – equivalent of bakla among the Māori.
 Kathoey – equivalent of bakla in Thailand.

References

External links
 Soft Minded Men

Gender in the Philippines
Gender systems
LGBT in the Philippines
Third gender